Holocentrus adscensionis is a squirrelfish of the family Holocentridae found in the Atlantic Ocean. Its range extends from North Carolina, USA to Brazil and throughout the Caribbean Sea in the Western Atlantic and from Gabon to Ascension Island in the Eastern Atlantic. A single record was reported in 2016 from the central Mediterranean Sea off Malta.

It can reach up to  TL in length, although it is more common for individuals to be around  TL.

References

External links
 

 

Holocentridae
Fish described in 1765
Taxa named by Pehr Osbeck
Fish of the Atlantic Ocean